Birthday Letters is a 1998 poetry collection by English poet and children's writer Ted Hughes. Released only months before Hughes's death, the collection won multiple prestigious literary awards. This collection of eighty-eight poems is widely considered to be Hughes's most explicit response to the suicide of his estranged wife Sylvia Plath in 1963, and to their widely discussed, politicized and "explosive" marriage.

Background
Until the publication of this book, 35 years after Plath's suicide, Hughes had said and published nearly nothing about his relationship and life with Plath. When it was discovered that he had infidelities while with Plath and had destroyed some of Plath's works after her death, some critics depicted him as a monster and Plath as a victim. In one instance, Hughes's name was chipped off from Plath's tombstone in Yorkshire.

The "Ted Hughes controversy" concerned his possible role in Plath's suicide and subsequent attempts at controlling the finished products of her poetry. The speculation resulted in extra-literary attention on Plath and Hughes and, consequently, their works as poets. Poems including "The Blue Flannel Suit" directly address their relationship, and many are directly addressed to Plath herself.

Reception
After her death in 1963, Plath's wish to leave behind a meaningful legacy was fulfilled when her Ariel collection of poetry, and her semi-autobiographical novel The Bell Jar, were hailed as masterpieces of modern feminism, causing her to become a feminist icon in the 1970s. Hughes's apparent wish for redemption is realized in this autobiographical collection of poetry. The literary response to the publication of this collection was one of sensation. It was unknown at the time that Hughes was suffering from a terminal disease that may have prompted this unexpected release.

Hughes's Birthday Letters topped the best-seller lists immediately. This was arguably due to public fascination with a persistent mystery surrounding the lives of the two icons. Within a short period of time the collection was awarded the Forward Poetry Prize, the T. S. Eliot Prize for Poetry and the Whitbread Poetry and Whitbread British Book of the Year prizes.

References

External links
Birthday Letters at the British Library

1998 poetry books
English poetry collections
Poetry by Ted Hughes
Costa Book Award-winning works
T. S. Eliot Prize-winning works
Faber and Faber books